The 1959 winners of the Torneo di Viareggio (in English, the Viareggio Tournament, officially the Viareggio Cup World Football Tournament Coppa Carnevale), the annual youth football tournament held in Viareggio, Tuscany, are listed below.

Format
The 8 teams are organized in knockout rounds. The round of 8 are played in two-legs, while the rest of the rounds are single tie.

Participating teams
Italian teams

  Fiorentina
  Juventus
  Milan
  Roma
  Sampdoria

European teams

  Partizan Beograd
  Racing Paris
  Rapid Wien

Tournament fixtures

Champions

Footnotes

External links
 Official Site (Italian)
 Results on RSSSF.com

1959
1958–59 in Italian football
1958–59 in Yugoslav football
1958–59 in Austrian football
1958–59 in French football